Eucalyptus conferta is a rare, slender tree that is endemic to a small area near Chewton, Victoria in Australia. It has thick, rough, fissured bark, dull green to bluish, lance-shaped adult leaves, flower buds arranged in groups of seven, white flowers and hemispherical fruit.

Description
Flowering occurs in autumn and the flowers are white.

Taxonomy and naming
Eucalyptus conferta was first formally described in 2012 by Kevin James Rule and the description was published in the journal Muelleria from a specimen collected in the Fryers Range west of Malmsbury. The specific epithet (conferta) is a Latin word meaning "pressed together", "crowded", "thick" or "dense", referring to the crowded leaves on immature plants.

Distribution and habitat

References

Flora of Victoria (Australia)
Trees of Australia
conferta
Myrtales of Australia
Plants described in 2012